San Bernardino is a village in Chihuahua, Mexico.

References

Populated places in Chihuahua (state)